Bruno Durieux (born 23 October 1944) is a French politician.

Biography 

Durieux is a graduate of the École polytechnique and ENSAE (École nationale de la statistique et de l'administration économique). He served in Algeria under the command of Marcel Bigeard before embarking upon an administrative career. Entering politics, Durieux served in the cabinet of Raymond Barre from 1976 to 1981, and was deputy of the Nord (département) from 1986 to 1990.  
 
In 1990 he became a member of the Michel Rocard administration. With the change in government in 1995, he was named by defense minister Charles Millon to represent the defense department overseas. In 1997, he was named president of the International Defense Counsel, a company 50% supported by the Ministry of Defense with a mission of consulting on the use of French weapons in countries employing French defense systems.

He was elected mayor of Grignan in the Drôme in 1995 and was reelected in 2001 and 2008. He is the town's current mayor.

External links 
 De l'IVG à la peine de mort, article polémique de l'Humanité sur les prises de position de Bruno Durieux.

1944 births
Living people
People from Sarthe
Politicians from Pays de la Loire
Reformist Movement (France) politicians
Centre of Social Democrats politicians
Union for French Democracy politicians
Government ministers of France
Deputies of the 8th National Assembly of the French Fifth Republic
Deputies of the 9th National Assembly of the French Fifth Republic
French military personnel of the Algerian War